Kachnariya is a village in the rajgarh district of Madhya Pradesh, India. It is located in thea biaora tehsil.

Demographics 

According to the 2011 census of India, Kachnariya has 267 households. The effective literacy rate (i.e. the literacy rate of population excluding children aged 6 and below) is 64.8%.

References 

Villages in Berasia tehsil